John Alexander Searing (May 14, 1805 – May 6, 1876) was an American politician who served one term as a U.S. Representative from New York from 1857 to 1859.

Biography 
Born in North Hempstead, New York, Searing completed preparatory studies. He was the sheriff of Queens County, New York from 1843 to 1846. He was a member of the New York State Assembly (Queens Co.) in 1854.

Congress 
Searing was elected as a Democrat to the 35th United States Congress (March 4, 1857 – March 3, 1859). He served as chairman of the Committee on Accounts (Thirty-fifth Congress). He declined to be a candidate for renomination in 1858.

Death and burial 
He died in Mineola, New York on May 6, 1876. He was interred in Greenfield Cemetery in Uniondale, New York.

Sources

External links
 

1805 births
1876 deaths
Democratic Party members of the New York State Assembly
Democratic Party members of the United States House of Representatives from New York (state)
19th-century American politicians